Gary Schnee is an American curler.

Teams

References

External links
 

Living people
American male curlers
American curling champions
Year of birth missing (living people)